Kataib Rouh Allah Issa Ibn Miriam (lit. The Brigade of the Spirit of God Jesus Son of Mary) is a militia composed of Christian Assyrians, trained and supplied by an Iraqi Shi'ite militia as a subgroup in the fight against ISIL.

Formation and activities
Kataib Rouh was formed in December 2014 as a Christian subgroup of the Kataib al-Imam Ali (Brigade of Imam Ali), itself the armed wing of Harakat al-Iraq al-Islamiyah (Movement of the Islamic Iraq).

Kataib al-Imam Ali entered the war against ISIL in June 2014 with uniformed, well-armed members. It has been quite active in Amerli, Tuz, and Diyala fighting alongside other Iraqi Shiite militias, all of them backed by Iranian IRGC. In Saladin Governorate, fighters from the group posed in videos with the severed heads of their slain enemies. In late December 2014, the group set about training Christians for a subgroup called Kataib Rouh wing.

References

Christian organizations
Syriac Christianity
2014 establishments in Iraq
Anti-ISIL factions in Iraq
War in Iraq (2013–2017)
Military units and formations established in 2014
Paramilitary forces of Iraq
Popular Mobilization Forces
Rebel groups in Iraq
Christianity in Iraq